The Lake Cargelligo railway line is a railway line in Central Western New South Wales, Australia. The first sod was turned commencing construction on 8 June 1913 with the line opening on 13 November 1917. The line branches from the Main South line at Cootamundra and travels in a north-westerly direction to the small town of Lake Cargelligo. The line is used primarily for grain haulage, although passenger service was provided until 1983.

The section between Cootamundra and Stockinbingal forms part of the cross country line between the Main South and Broken Hill line, which allows goods trains to bypass Sydney.

In December 2007, flooding washed away several sections of track between Ungarie and Lake Cargelligo rendering the track unpassable. The rail line has since then been repaired between Ungarie and Lake Cargelligo rendering the tracks open.

Early operations
From the opening of the line in 1913 daily passenger services were operated by mixed goods and passenger steam trains, the passenger carriages being 'dog box' configuration. It was not until 1938 after much complaint by passengers that more comfortable 'corridor' type passenger carriages were introduced on the branch line to Lake Cargelligo.
In the same year after more agitation from residents serviced by this line the Railway Commissioners agreed to a new diesel rail motor service to operate between Temora (departing daily at 08:30am) and Lake Cargelligo, the new train commenced from late 1938 replacing the mixed steam trains that had operated since opening. Later CPH railmotors operated on this line until passenger services were ceased in 1983.

Management
The line is owned by the Rail Infrastructure Corporation of New South Wales, however the section between Cootamundra and Stockinbingal is leased by the Australian Rail Track Corporation (ARTC) who are responsible for the maintenance and operation of the line. The ARTC is responsible for co-ordinating operations over the remainder of the line.

Gallery

See also
 Rail transport in New South Wales

Further reading 

The Centenary of Lake Cargelligo and the Railway's Role - Australian Railway Historical Society Bulletin, October, 1973, pp217–239

References

External links

Regional railway lines in New South Wales
Standard gauge railways in Australia
Railway lines opened in 1917